A halo is an optical phenomenon produced by light (typically from the Sun or Moon) interacting with ice crystals suspended in the atmosphere. Halos can have many forms, ranging from colored or white rings to arcs and spots in the sky. Many of these appear near the Sun or Moon, but others occur elsewhere or even in the opposite part of the sky. Among the best known halo types are the circular halo (properly called the 22° halo), light pillars, and sun dogs, but many others occur; some are fairly common while others are extremely rare.

The ice crystals responsible for halos are typically suspended in cirrus or cirrostratus clouds in the upper troposphere, but in cold weather they can also float near the ground, in which case they are referred to as diamond dust. The particular shape and orientation of the crystals are responsible for the type of halo observed. Light is reflected and refracted by the ice crystals and may split into colors because of dispersion. The crystals behave like prisms and mirrors, refracting and reflecting light between their faces, sending shafts of light in particular directions.
Atmospheric optical phenomena like halos were used as part of weather lore, which was an empirical means of weather forecasting before meteorology was developed. They often do indicate that rain will fall within the next 24 hours, since the cirrostratus clouds that cause them can signify an approaching frontal system.

Other common types of optical phenomena involving water droplets rather than ice crystals include the glory and rainbow.

History 
While Aristotle had mentioned halos and parhelia, in antiquity, the first European descriptions of complex displays were those of Christoph Scheiner in Rome (circa 1630), Johannes Hevelius in Danzig (1661), and Tobias Lowitz in St Petersburg (c. 1794).
Chinese observers had recorded these for centuries, the first reference being a section of the "Official History of the Chin Dynasty" (Chin Shu) in 637, on the "Ten Haloes", giving technical terms for 26 solar halo phenomena.

Vädersolstavlan

While mostly known and often quoted for being the oldest color depiction of the city of Stockholm, Vädersolstavlan (Swedish; "The Sundog Painting", literally "The Weather Sun Painting") is arguably also one of the oldest known depictions of a halo display, including a pair of sun dogs. For two hours in the morning of 20 April 1535, the skies over the city were filled with white circles and arcs crossing the sky, while additional suns (i.e., sun dogs) appeared around the sun.

Light pillar 

A light pillar, or sun pillar, appears as a vertical pillar or column of light rising from the sun near sunset or sunrise, though it can appear below the sun, particularly if the observer is at a high elevation or altitude.  Hexagonal plate- and column-shaped ice crystals cause the phenomenon.  Plate crystals generally cause pillars only when the sun is within 6 degrees of the horizon; column crystals can cause a pillar when the sun is as high as 20 degrees above the horizon.  The crystals tend to orient themselves near-horizontally as they fall or float through the air, and the width and visibility of a sun pillar depend on crystal alignment.

Light pillars can also form around the moon, and around street lights or other bright lights.  Pillars forming from ground-based light sources may appear much taller than those associated with the sun or moon.  Since the observer is closer to the light source, crystal orientation matters less in the formation of these pillars.

Circular halo 

Among the best-known halos is the 22° halo, often just called "halo", which appears as a large ring around the Sun or Moon with a radius of about 22° (roughly the width of an outstretched hand at arm's length). The ice crystals that cause the 22° halo are oriented semi-randomly in the atmosphere, in contrast to the horizontal orientation required for some other halos such as sun dogs and light pillars. As a result of the optical properties of the ice crystals involved, no light is reflected towards the inside of the ring, leaving the sky noticeably darker than the sky around it, and giving it the impression of a "hole in the sky". The 22° halo is not to be confused with the corona, which is a different optical phenomenon caused by water droplets rather than ice crystals, and which has the appearance of a multicolored disk rather than a ring.

Other haloes can form at 46° to the sun, or at the horizon, or around the zenith, and can appear as full haloes or incomplete arcs.

Bottlinger's ring 
A Bottlinger's ring is a rare type of halo that is elliptical instead of circular. It has a small diameter, which makes it very difficult to see in the Sun's glare and more likely to be spotted around the dimmer Subsun, often seen from mountain tops or airplanes. Bottlinger's rings are not well understood yet. It is suggested that they are formed by very flat pyramidal ice crystals with faces at uncommonly low angles, suspended horizontally in the atmosphere. These precise and physically problematic requirements would explain why the halo is very rare.

Other names 
In the Anglo-Cornish dialect of English, a halo round the sun or the moon is called a cock's eye and is a token of bad weather. The term is related to the Breton word kog-heol (sun cock) which has the same meaning. In Nepal, the halo round the sun is called Indrasabha with a connotation of the assembly court of Lord Indra – the Hindu god of lightning, thunder and rain.

Artificial halos 
The natural phenomena may be reproduced artificially by several means. Firstly, by computer simulations, or secondly by experimental means. Regarding the latter, one may either take a single crystal and rotate it around the appropriate axis/axes, or take a chemical approach. A still further and more indirect experimental approach is to find analogous refraction geometries.

Analogous refraction approach 
 This approach employs the fact that in some cases the average geometry of refraction through an ice crystal may be imitated / mimicked via the refraction through another geometrical object. In this way, the Circumzenithal arc, the Circumhorizontal arc and the suncave Parry arcs may be recreated by refraction through rotationally symmetric (i.e. non-prismatic) static bodies. A particularly simple table-top experiment reproduces artificially the colorful circumzenithal and circumhorizontal arcs using a water glass only. The refraction through the cylinder of water turns out to be (almost) identical to the rotationally averaged refraction through an upright hexagonal ice crystal / plate-oriented crystals, thereby creating vividly colored circumzenithal and the circumhorizontal arcs. In fact, the water glass experiment is often confused as representing a rainbow and has been around at least since 1920.

Following Huygens' idea of the (false) mechanism of the 22° parhelia, one may also illuminate (from the side) a water-filled cylindrical glass with an inner central obstruction of half the glasses' diameter to achieve upon projection on a screen an appearance which closely resembles parhelia (cf. footnote [39] in Ref., or see here), i.e. an inner red edge transitioning into a white band at larger angles on both sides of the direct transmission direction. However, while the visual match is close, this particular experiment does not involve a fake caustic mechanism and is thus no real analogue.

Chemical approaches 
The earliest chemical recipes to generate artificial halos has been put forward by Brewster and studied further by A. Cornu in 1889.
 The idea was to generate crystals by precipitation of a salt solution. The innumerable small crystals hereby generated will then, upon illumination with light, cause halos corresponding to the particular crystal geometry and the orientation / alignment. Several recipes exist and continue to be discovered. Rings are a common outcome of such experiments. But also Parry arcs have been artificially produced in this way.

Mechanical approaches

Single axis 
The earliest experimental studies on halo phenomena have been attributed to Auguste Bravais in 1847. Bravais used an equilateral glass prism which he spun around its vertical axis. When illuminated by parallel white light, this produced an artificial Parhelic circle and many of the embedded parhelia. Similarly, A. Wegener used hexagonal rotating crystals to produce artificial subparhelia. In a more recent version of this experiment, many more embedded parhelia have been found using commercially available hexagonal BK7 glass crystals. Simple experiments like these can be used for educational purposes and demonstration experiments. Unfortunately, using glass crystals one cannot reproduce the circumzenithal arc or the circumhorizontal arc due to total internal reflections preventing the required ray-paths when .

Even earlier than Bravais, the Italian scientist F. Venturi experimented with pointed water-filled prisms to demonstrate the circumzenithal arc. However, this explanation was replaced later by the CZA's correct explanation by Bravais.

 Artificial ice crystals have been employed to create halos which are otherwise unattainable in the mechanical approach via the use of glass crystals, e.g. circumzenithal and circumhorizontal arcs. The use of ice crystals ensures that the generated halos have the same angular coordinates as the natural phenomena. Other crystals such as NaF also have a refractive index close to ice and have been used in the past.

Two axes 
In order to produce artificial halos such as the tangent arcs or the circumscribed halo one should rotate a single columnar hexagonal crystal about 2 axes. Similarly, the Lowitz arcs can be created by rotating a single plate crystal about two axes. This can be done by engineered halo machines. The first such machine was constructed in 2003; several more followed. Putting such machines inside spherical projection screens, and by the principle of the so-called sky transform, the analogy is nearly perfect. A realization using micro-versions of the aforementioned machines produces authentic distortion-free projections of such complex artificial halos. Finally, superposition of several images and projections produced by such halo machines may be combined to create a single image. The resulting superposition image is then a representation of complex natural halo displays containing many different orientation sets of ice prisms.

Three axes 
The experimental reproduction of circular halos is the most difficult using a single crystal only, while it is the simplest and typically achieved one using chemical recipes. Using a single crystal, one needs to realize all possible 3D orientations of the crystal. This has recently been achieved by two approaches. The first one using pneumatics and a sophisticated rigging, and a second one using an Arduino-based random walk machine which stochastically reorients a crystal embedded in a transparent thin-walled sphere.

Gallery

See also

References

External links 

 Halo explanations and image galleries at Atmospheric Optics
 Meteoros AKM – Halo explanations and image galleries
 Halo reports of interesting halo observations around the World
 Southern Hemisphere Halo and other atmospheric phenomena
 Halo in Chisinau Moldova (photo and video)
 Walter Tape & Jarmo Moilanen, Atmospheric Halos and the Search for Angle x (free e-book)
 Halo Phenomena – Hyperphysics

Atmospheric optical phenomena